Chris Cooper (born 1951) is an American actor.

Chris Cooper also may refer to:

In sports:
Chris Cooper (broadcaster) ( 1990s), British football commentator
Chris Cooper (defensive lineman) (born 1977), American defensive lineman
Chris Cooper (safety) (born 1994), American football safety
Chris Cooper (baseball) (1978–2023), American pitcher
Chris Cooper (basketball) (born 1990), American player
In arts and literature:
 Christian Cooper (fl. 1988–2014), American comic book writer
 Christian H. Cooper (born 1976), American author and financial trader
  Chris Cooper (born 1968), American hot rod artist, known as Coop
In other fields:
Christopher R. Cooper  (born 1966), American district judge